Scottish National League may refer to nationwide competitions in Scotland in a number of sports:

 Scottish Men's National League in basketball
 Scottish National League (ice hockey), founded 1998
 Scottish National League (1932–1954)
 Scottish National League (1981–1982)
 Scottish National League (rugby league)
 Scottish National League (rugby union)

It may also refer to the political group the Scots National League